Lieutenant colonel  is a rank of commissioned officers in the armies, most marine forces and some air forces of the world, above a major and below a colonel. Several police forces in the United States use the rank of lieutenant colonel. The rank of lieutenant colonel is often shortened to simply "colonel" in conversation and in unofficial correspondence. Sometimes, the term 'half-colonel' is used in casual conversation in the British Army. In the United States Air Force, the term 'light bird' or 'light bird colonel' (as opposed to a 'full bird colonel') is an acceptable casual reference to the rank but is never used directly towards the rank holder. A lieutenant colonel is typically in charge of a battalion or regiment in the army.

The following articles deal with the rank of lieutenant colonel:
 Lieutenant-colonel (Canada)
 Lieutenant colonel (Eastern Europe)
 Lieutenant colonel (Turkey)
 Lieutenant colonel (Sri Lanka)
 Lieutenant colonel (United Kingdom)
 Lieutenant colonel (United States)

Gallery

Army

Air Force

Other services

See also 
 Comparative military ranks
 Canadian Forces ranks and insignia
 British Army officer rank insignia
 United States Army officer rank insignia

References 

Military ranks
Military ranks of Singapore
Military ranks of the Nepali Army